The 2015 World Rugby Pacific Nations Cup was the tenth edition of the World Rugby Pacific Nations Cup (formerly known as the IRB Pacific Nations Cup), an annual international rugby union tournament. The 2015 title was contested between the Tier 2 nations of Canada, Fiji, Japan, Samoa, Tonga and the United States.

Due to the 2015 Rugby World Cup, the tournament took place in July and August with all teams having access to overseas players. Like the 2014 IRB Pacific Nations Cup, the six teams were divided into two pools, but instead of playing each team from the same pool like in 2014, each team played the three teams from the opposing pool. Following the three rounds of cross pool matches, the six teams were seeded one through to six and played in three final play-offs to determine who finishes first to sixth. The final was contested between Fiji and Samoa, who had previously drawn 30–30 during the Cross-pool matches. Fiji won the final 39–29, scoring 6 tries to claim their second title.

Venues
Five venues will be used:

Table

Fixtures
The full match schedule was announced on 19 February 2015.

Cross-pool matches

Round 1

Notes:
 Peceli Yato made his international debut for Fiji.
 Telusa Veainu made his international debuts for Tonga.

Notes:
 Thyssen de Goede and Callum Morrison made their international debuts for Canada.
 Tim Bennetts made his international debut for Japan.

Notes:
 AJ MacGinty and Zack Test made their international debuts for the United States.
 Motu Matu'u and Sanele Vavae Tuilagi made their international debuts for Samoa.

Round 2

Notes:
 This was Fiji's and Samoa's first draw since 1989.
 Faleniu Iosi made his international debut for Samoa.

Notes:
 Sosefo Sakalia and Viliami Tahitu'a made their international debuts for Tonga.

Notes:
 Alastair McFarland made his international debut for the United States.
 Mike Petri earned his 50th test cap for the United States.

Round 3

Notes:
 Chris Baumann made his international debut for the United States.
 Sosefo Ma'ake and Jack Ram made their international debuts for Tonga.

Notes:
 Evan Olmstead made his international debut for Canada.
 Francis Ieremia made hie international debut for Samoa.

Finals

3rd Place play-off

5th Place play-off

Notes:
 This was the United States first win over Canada in Canada since 2005.
 With the United States win in 2014, this was the United States first back to back wins since 2003.

1st Place play-off

Final positioning

Statistics

Points scorers

Try scorers

Squads

Note: Number of caps and players' ages are indicated as of 18 July 2015 – the tournament's opening day, pre first tournament match.

Canada
Canada's 36-man squad for the 2015 World Rugby Pacific Nations Cup.

Phil Mack, John Moonlight and Nathan Hirayama were late additions to the squad.

Harry Jones and Conor Trainor were added to the squad ahead of the Samoan match.

Nanyak Dala and Jake Ilnicki were added to the squad ahead of the United States final match.

Fiji
On 12 July 2015, Head Coach John McKee announced a 31-man squad for the 2015 World Rugby Pacific Nations Cup. * denotes non-traveling reserves.

Japan
On 29 June 2015, Jones named a 37-man squad for the 2015 World Rugby Pacific Nations Cup.

Samoa
Samoa 30-man squad for the 2015 World Rugby Pacific Nations Cup.

Jack Lam was a late call up to the squad.

Tonga
On the 22 June, head coach Mana Otai announced their 31-man squad for the 2015 World Rugby Pacific Nations Cup in Fiji and Canada. Five debutantes join a squad that draws on the experience of 2014's European Test squad, with familiar faces like Nili Latu returning to continue his string leadership role within the team.

Wayne Ngaluafe and Viliami Tahitu'a were called up for the Canada test.

Jack Ram was called up ahead of the USA test.

United States
United States 32-man squad for the 2015 World Rugby Pacific Nations Cup.

Inaki Basauri, John Cullen, Tom Coolican, Lemoto Filikitonga, Ben Landry, Chad London, Samu Manoa, Tim Maupin, Ronnie McLean, Louis Mulholland, Zachary Pangelinan, Robbie Shaw, Mike Shepherd, Tim Stanfill, Kyle Sumsion, Matt Trouville, Tai Tuisamoa  and Nicholas Wallace were all in the 2015 Rugby World Cup training squad, but was not selected for the final PNC squad.

Tim Stanfill and Nicholas Wallace were added to the main squad ahead of the round 3 clash with Tonga.

See also
 2015 mid-year rugby union internationals
 2015 Rugby World Cup warm-up matches

References

External links
 

2015
2015 rugby union tournaments for national teams
2015 in Oceanian rugby union
2015 in American rugby union
2015 in Canadian rugby union
2015 in Fijian rugby union
2014–15 in Japanese rugby union
2015 in Samoan rugby union
2015 in Tongan rugby union